Tetracis cachexiata, the white slant-line or white slaut, is a moth of the family Geometridae. The species was first described by Achille Guenée in 1858. It is found in North America from Nova Scotia to central British Columbia, south to northern Florida and west to Montana and northern Colorado.

The length of the forewings 19–26 mm. Adults are on wing from May to early July.

The larvae feed on various plants including Alnus, Betula, Prunus, Salix, Tilia, Ulmus, Viburnum, Abies, Larix, Pinus, and Tsuga species.

References

External links
Revision of the North American genera Tetracis Guenée and synonymization of Synaxis Hulst with descriptions of three new species (Lepidoptera: Geometridae: Ennominae)

Tetracis
Moths described in 1858